Sherwood Forest is an unincorporated community in Worcester County, Maryland, United States. Sherwood Forest is located in the southern portion of Ocean Pines.

References

Unincorporated communities in Worcester County, Maryland
Unincorporated communities in Maryland